Bryan Douglas Anderson (born December 16, 1986) is an American former professional baseball catcher who played in Major League Baseball (MLB) for the St. Louis Cardinals, Chicago White Sox, and Oakland Athletics, and in international competition for the United States national baseball team.

Career

St. Louis Cardinals
Anderson was born in Thousand Oaks, California, on December 16, 1986.  He attended Simi Valley High School in Simi Valley, California. The Cardinals selected him in the fourth round (140th overall) of the June 2005 First-Year Player Draft.

Following the draft, Anderson was assigned to big league camp and was one of the youngest non-roster invitees in the organization history. He was then assigned to the Johnson City Cardinals, the Cardinals's rookie league team in the Appalachian League. He played 51 games in 2005 for Johnson City and hit .331.  In 2006, he began with the Single-A Quad Cities River Bandits in the Midwest League. He played the full year and batted .302.  In 2007, he was advanced to the Springfield Cardinals, the Double-A affiliate in Missouri of the Texas League.  He did very well and hit .298.  He began 2008 in Springfield, hitting .388 with two homers and 14 RBIs in April.  He was then promoted to the Triple-A Memphis Redbirds of Pacific Coast League (PCL). He spent 2009 in Memphis as well, and many argue he should have been given a spot on the big league roster.

In 2010, Anderson was a non-roster invitee to Cardinals spring training. On March 15 he was optioned to Memphis.

In April 2010, Anderson was recalled from Memphis when back up catcher Jason LaRue was placed on the 15-day disabled list.  He made his Major League debut on April 15, 2010.  He saw limited action, appearing in 4 games, and was reassigned to Memphis on April 27 when LaRue was reactivated.

Anderson battled Tony Cruz during spring training for the backup catcher for the Major League Cardinals. He ended up starting the season at Triple-A Memphis, under trade speculation as he was a hot commodity and on many trade table talks, but remained in Memphis and was eventually called up to the big league club during the summer. Anderson went 3-for-12 in limited at-bats for St. Louis, while batting .255 in one hundred plate appearances for Memphis. In November, 2012 St. Louis cleared space on the 40-man off season roster by outrighting Anderson and two others back to Memphis. He subsequently elected to become a free agent, which allowed him to search for teams that could possible offer an immediate big league job.

Chicago White Sox
On November 21, 2012, relatively early in the off season, Anderson signed a minor league deal with the Chicago White Sox. He was called up to the big leagues to serve as a split time catcher and at the end of the season was outrighted off the roster on October 4, 2013. He subsequently elected to become a free agent.

Cincinnati Reds
Anderson signed a minor league contract with the Cincinnati Reds in January 2014. He hit .320 with 10 homers during the season until he was traded to the Oakland A's after the trade deadline on August 24, 2014 for international money.

Oakland Athletics

The Reds traded Anderson to the Oakland Athletics on August 24, 2014. After the trade he was assigned to Oakland and remained with the big league team for the rest of the season. He played the majority of the 2015 season with the Triple-A Nashville Sounds, but was called up to Oakland during the summer. He was outrighted back to Nashville after the season, and later elected free agency. He signed another minor league contract with the A's for 2016 and went to big league camp.  He became a free agent on November 7, 2016.

Personal
Bryan married his wife, Rachel, in 2014 and they have one daughter. Rachel is a former pediatric nurse from Cleveland, Ohio.

References

External links
 

Baseball Almanac

1986 births
Living people
Major League Baseball catchers
St. Louis Cardinals players
Chicago White Sox players
Oakland Athletics players
Johnson City Cardinals players
Swing of the Quad Cities players
Springfield Cardinals players
Team USA players
Gigantes de Carolina players
Surprise Rafters players
Peoria Saguaros players
Memphis Redbirds players
Gulf Coast Cardinals players
Charlotte Knights players
Pensacola Blue Wahoos players
Louisville Bats players
Sacramento River Cats players
Baseball players from California
People from Simi Valley, California
Nashville Sounds players
Sportspeople from Ventura County, California